Andy Murray defeated Fernando Verdasco in the final, 6–3, 6–2 to win the men's singles tennis title at the 2017 Dubai Tennis Championships. Murray saved seven match points en route to the title, against Philipp Kohlschreiber in the quarterfinals. He won the second set tiebreak of that match with a score of 20–18, equaling the record of the longest tiebreak in history, until the record was broken in 2022.

Stan Wawrinka was the defending champion, but lost in the first round to Damir Džumhur.

Seeds

Draw

Finals

Top half

Bottom half

Qualifying

Seeds
{{columns-list|colwidth=30em|
  Denis Istomin (qualified)
  Andreas Seppi (Qualifying competition, lucky loser)
  Sergiy Stakhovsky (first round)
  Andrey Rublev (first round)
  Evgeny Donskoy (qualified)
  Marius Copil (qualified)
  Thomas Fabbiano (first round)
  Lukáš Rosol (qualified)
}}

Qualifiers

Lucky loser
  Andreas Seppi'''

Qualifying draw

First qualifier

Second qualifier

Third qualifier

Fourth qualifier

References

External links
 Main draw
 Qualifying draw

Singles